CCC Pro Team was a UCI WorldTeam co-owned and managed by American cyclist Jim Ochowicz, who founded the 7-Eleven Cycling Team. After its last title sponsor, CCC, a Polish shoe retailer, pulled out due to financial difficulties resulting from the COVID-19 pandemic, Ochowicz was unable to find another major sponsor, so the team disbanded at the end of the 2020 season. In its place, Belgian UCI ProTeam  took over the team's license and was promoted to a UCI WorldTeam.

Ownership
The team was owned by Swiss businessman Andy Rihs until his death. After his death the team passed to Jim Ochowicz and  Gavin Chilcott.

History
The team was founded as BMC Racing Team in 2007, sponsored by the bicycle manufacturer BMC Switzerland. The team signed a number of major international riders for the 2010 season, including 2009 World Champion, two-time Tour de France runner-up and 2011 winner Cadel Evans, 2009 U.S. Road Race Champion George Hincapie, 2008 World Champion Alessandro Ballan and Spring Classics specialists Karsten Kroon and Marcus Burghardt.

In 2010 the team participated in their first Grand Tours, having been invited to compete in the 2010 Tour de France and the 2010 Giro d'Italia. In 2011, the team attained UCI ProTeam status, the most prestigious classification available, and BMC rider Cadel Evans won the 2011 Tour de France. For 2012 the team signed Thor Hushovd and Philippe Gilbert, the 2010 and 2012 world-champions respectively.

In 2012, Evans was unable to defend his title at the Tour de France, finishing in seventh overall, two places behind teammate Tejay van Garderen.

Cadel Evans placed third overall at the 2013 Giro d'Italia.

At the 2013 Tour de France, Cadel Evans finished 39th, Tejay van Garderen 45th, with Steve Morabito the highest placed overall at 35th. Shortly after the end of the Tour, it was announced that John Lelangue, who had been directeur sportif since the team was founded in 2007, was leaving the team "for personal reasons". In September 2013 Jim Ochowicz announced the appointment of Valerio Piva as Lelangue's replacement.

For the 2015 season, BMC signed Alessandro De Marchi, Damiano Caruso and Jempy Drucker for the 2015 season The team also announced they had signed Rohan Dennis –  his transfer however was effective immediately. Avermaet finished 8th in the World Tour individual classification. Meanwhile, the team won the Team Time Trial World Championship.

For the 2016 season, the team signed Richie Porte. He scored podiums at the Tour Down Under and Paris–Nice to finish 7th in the World Tour individual classification, whereas Van Avermaet finished 6th overall after winning the Tirreno–Adriatico and GP de Montréal.

In the 2017 season, Van Avermaet won the Omloop Het Nieuwsblad, E3 Harelbeke, Gent–Wevelgem and the Paris–Roubaix, therefore he claimed the first place at the World Tour individual classification. Porte finished 12th overall, having won the Tour Down Under and Tour de Romandie. BMC ranked third in the World Tour points classification.

In the 2018 season, Porte won the Tour de Suisse.

In July 2018 the team announced that CCC would become the new title sponsor of the Continuum Sports-owned team, a move that would expand CCC's presence in cycling, with CCC's Professional Continental team, CCC Sprandi Polkowice, stepping down to the Continental level for the 2019 season as CCC Development Team. Van Avermaet will continue as leader, whereas Porte is expected to leave the team.

In September 2020 CCC Team agreed to sell their WorldTour licence to Belgian ProTeam Circus-Wanty Gobert.

Doping
In April 2010, Thomas Frei tested positive for erythropoietin (EPO), Frei was immediately withdrawn from racing by the team. Frei was later sacked by the team.

In August 2017, the UCI confirmed that Samuel Sánchez had returned a positive out of competition drug test for GHRP-2 (Pralmorelin). He was immediately suspended by the team pending analysis of his B-sample.

In February 2019, Kronen Zeitung broke news that a number of professional cyclists had been implicated in the doping scandal uncovered at the 2019 FIS Nordic World Ski Championships. Later, Stefan Denifl confessed to blood doping in a police interview. Denifl had been due to join CCC Team in 2019 but his contract was terminated at Denifl's request in December 2018. CCC Team general manager Jim Ochowicz confirmed that the team's medical assessment of Denifl's biological passport showed no warning signs of blood doping.

Final team roster

Major wins

National and world champions

2011
 Norway Road Race, Alexander Kristoff
 Switzerland Time Trial, Martin Kohler
2012
 Switzerland Road Race, Martin Kohler
 World Road Race, Philippe Gilbert
2013
 Italian Road Race, Ivan Santaromita
 Italian Time Trial, Marco Pinotti
 Switzerland Road Race, Michael Schär
 Norway Road Race, Thor Hushovd
2014
 USA Time Trial, Taylor Phinney
 Slovakia Time Trial, Peter Velits
2015
 World Track (Individual pursuit), Stefan Küng
 Switzerland Time Trial, Silvan Dillier
 Switzerland Road Race, Danilo Wyss
 Switzerland Track (Individual pursuit), Stefan Küng
 Switzerland Track (Points race), Stefan Küng
2016
 Australian Time Trial, Rohan Dennis
 USA Time Trial, Taylor Phinney
 Italian Time Trial, Manuel Quinziato
 Belgium Road Race Championships, Philippe Gilbert
2017
 Australian Time Trial, Rohan Dennis
 Australian Road Race, Miles Scotson
 Luxembourg Time Trial, Jempy Drucker
 Switzerland Time Trial, Stefan Küng
 USA Time Trial, Joey Rosskopf
 Switzerland Road Race, Silvan Dillier
2018
 Australian Time Trial, Rohan Dennis
 USA Time Trial, Joey Rosskopf
 Switzerland Time Trial, Stefan Küng
 World Time Trial, Rohan Dennis
2019
 New Zealand Time Trial, Patrick Bevin
 Poland Road Race, Michal Paluta
2020
 Czech Republic Time Trial, Josef Černý
 Poland Time Trial, Kamil Gradek

Sponsors
In 2019, besides CCC, notable sponsors include Giant, and Etxeondo.

References

External links

Former UCI WorldTeams
Cycling teams based in the United States
Cycling teams based in Poland
Cycling teams established in 2007
Cycling teams established in 2019
2007 establishments in the United States
2019 establishments in Poland
Defunct cycling teams based in Poland
Defunct cycling teams based in the United States